"Goodbye" is a single by The Corrs, released in 2006 as the lead single from their compilation album Dreams: The Ultimate Corrs Collection. It is a remixed version of a song that originally appeared on their 2004 album Borrowed Heaven. The song was only released as a digital single, which caused frustration with fans who were willing but not able to purchase it. The bonus tracks include a demo version of "Goodbye" sung by Sharon and a new instrumental called "Pebble in the Brook".

Track listing
"Goodbye" (2006 remix) – 3:45
"Goodbye" (album version) – 4:08
"Goodbye" (demo version) – 3:38
"Pebble in the Brook" – 3:06

Music video

The video for the single, similar to the "Love To Love You" and "Runaway" remix videos, features live footage from the concert in Geneva, part of the Borrowed Heaven tour (2004), interspersed with various clips from previous concerts (Lansdowne Road, Ischgl, London), recording sessions and behind the scenes snippets from the documentaries "All The Way Home" and "The Right Time".

References

The Corrs songs
2006 singles
2004 songs
Warner Records singles